Tepehuanes Municipality  is a municipality in the Mexican state of Durango. It is located in the North West of Durango at 25°12'"-26°25'"N 105°23'"-106°40'"W, at an elevation of about 1,830 meters (6000 feet).

The municipal seat is at Santa Catarina de Tepehuanes.

Borders
It is bordered to the north by the municipality of Guanaceví, the municipality of El Oro to the east, the municipality of Santiago Papasquiaro to the south, the municipality of Canelas to the southwest, the municipality of Topia to the west, and the municipality of Tamazula to the northwest along with the state of Chihuahua.

Territory
The total area of the municipality (urban and rural) is 6401.50 square kilometers, which represents 95.95% of the state.

Name
The town gained its name from the native Tepehuan Indians. Their name is Nahuatl for mountain dweller.

Population
As of 2010, the municipality had a total population of 10,745, down from 11,605 as of 2005.

The municipality had 340 localities, the largest of which (with Santa Catarina de Tepehuanes (4,761)), classified as urban.

History

Founding

When the Spanish arrived in the area, they met a large tribe known as the Great Tepehuan Nation living on the eastern side of the Sierra Madre Occidental. The Tepehuan practiced ritual cannibalism and were fierce with their enemies. The capital of the Tepehuan Nation was named Ubamari in honor of a Tepehuan god. In 1597 Father and Jesuit Jerónimo Ramírez arrived from the northeast of Durango on a mission to establish missionaries and evangelize the natives who inhabited the region. After great difficulty and the help of a Tepehuan woman, he convinced the Tepehauns to establish a settlement on the bend that forms the terrain next to the Tepehuan River where the church symbolized the foundation. On 16 July 1597 the mission of Santa Catarina de Tepehuanes, Durango was founded, and would later be the base of the municipality of Tepehuanes.

Rebellion of 1616
Although the Spanish were well received by the natives, the Spanish sought enrichment and power. They considered themselves a superior race, not just for the color of their skin, but for the power of their arms. They subjugated and enslaved the natives for their own private services. Nineteen years after the founding of the mission in Tepehuanes at the start of the 17th century, a rebellion by the Tepehuans began led by the violent and bewitching Quautlatas who martyred several priests, along with 70 black slaves, 200 Spaniards of all age and condition, and the countless converts who embraced their faith so much they chose death over renouncing it.

18th Century to Today
For the 18th century Tepehaunes was part of Santiago Papasquiaro. In 1910 the Mexican Revolution began and Tepehuanes was not spared the fighting between the revolutionaries and the federalists. It's during the revolution that Tepehuanes became an independent municipality in 1917 due to the breakdown of political leadership. Félix López was its first municipal president.
In March 1917 the Revolutionary Leader, Fransico Villa, was defeated in Tepehuanes by the General, Miguel Aguirre Gonzalez.

Climate

Communities
Tepehuanes has several branching communities (pueblos) surrounding the town.
El Taiste 
San Jose De La Boca
La Purísima
El Rincón
Carreras
Los Pinos
San Nicolás de El Presidios
Sandías
La Ciénega
Corrales
Arroyo Chico
San Isidro De Las Calabazas
Los Cerritos
El Sebollin
Los Bagres
El Corazon 
La Candela
Presidios
San Ignacio
Zapiguri del primo efrain huevon 
La Mesa De Navar
San Pedro De Pescaderos 
El Potrero De Chaidez 
El Refugio
San Miguel

References

Municipalities of Durango